Alexandru Bodgan Ceauşu (born 12 October 1980) is a Romanian sprint canoeist who competed in the early to mid-2000s. He won two silver medals at the 2003 ICF Canoe Sprint World Championships in Gainesville, earning them in the K-4 200 m and K-4 500 m events.

Ceauşu also finished seventh in the K-4 1000 m event at the 2004 Summer Olympics in Athens.

References 

Sports-reference.com profile

1980 births
Canoeists at the 2004 Summer Olympics
Living people
Olympic canoeists of Romania
Romanian male canoeists
ICF Canoe Sprint World Championships medalists in kayak